Make Someone Happy may refer to:

 Make Someone Happy (Sophie Milman album), 2007
 Make Someone Happy (Lonnie Liston Smith album), 1986
 Make Someone Happy (We Five album), 1967
 "Make Someone Happy" (song), a song from the musical Do Re Mi
 "Make Someone Happy", an episode from season 5 of Thomas & Friends